Valley Paper Mill Chimney and Site is a historic chimney and archaeological site located at Alcove in Albany County, New York.  It consists of the surviving 1844 Valley Paper Mill chimney and the site of the former straw pulp paper mill. The chimney is a rectangular brick tapered structure measuring 9.5 feet by 9.5 feet at its base and rising 110 feet.  The mill was destroyed by fire in 1891 and the site leveled and filled.  A significant portion of the site remains undisturbed from the time of the fire.

It was listed on the National Register of Historic Places in 2004.

References

Industrial buildings and structures on the National Register of Historic Places in New York (state)
Archaeological sites on the National Register of Historic Places in New York (state)
Industrial buildings completed in 1844
Towers completed in 1844
National Register of Historic Places in Albany County, New York
Chimneys in the United States
Pulp and paper mills in the United States
1844 establishments in New York (state)